Cornelis Nicolaas Hin (6 October 1869 – 21 October 1944) was a sailor from the Netherlands, who represented his native country at the 1920 Summer Olympics in Ostend, Belgium.

During the second race one of the marks was drifting and the race was abandoned. Since the organizers did not have the time to re-sail the race that week the two remaining races were rescheduled for September 3 of that year. Since both contenders were Dutch, the organizers requested the Dutch Olympic Committee to organize the race in The Netherlands.

With his son Johan Hin as crew Hin won the first race. His son Frans Hin crewed the remaining races in The Netherlands on the Buiten IJ, in front of Durgerdam near Amsterdam. Hin took the gold over the combined series with his boat Beatrijs III.

Sources

Note

1869 births
1944 deaths
People from Den Helder
Dutch male sailors (sport)
Sailors at the 1920 Summer Olympics – 12' Dinghy
Olympic sailors of the Netherlands
Medalists at the 1920 Summer Olympics
Olympic medalists in sailing
Olympic gold medalists for the Netherlands
Sportspeople from North Holland